Peter Mulvey (born September 6, 1969) is an American folk singer-songwriter based in Milwaukee, Wisconsin. Since the early 1990s, he has developed a strong national following in the indie folk/rock scene through his relentless touring and critically acclaimed albums. Starting his musical career in Milwaukee while at Marquette University, he honed his performing skills while traveling in Dublin, Ireland. He later spent several years in Boston, where he frequently performed in the city's subway system. He is best known for his warmly wry songwriting and his intense percussive guitar style.

Discography

Albums 
1992 - Rabbit Talk (self-released demo tape)
1992 - Brother Rabbit Speaks (re-issued in 2001)
1994 - Rain (re-issued in 2001)
1995 - Rapture
1997 - Goodbye Bob (EP)
1997 - Deep Blue
1998 - Glencree (live album)
2000 - The Trouble with Poets
2002 - Ten Thousand Mornings (cover album recorded entirely in the Davis Square T Station)
2004 - Kitchen Radio
2005 - Redbird (with Kris Delmhorst, Jeffrey Foucault and David Goodrich)
2006 - The Knuckleball Suite
2007 - Notes from Elsewhere (acoustic retrospective album)
2009 - Letters from a Flying Machine
2009 - The Bicycle (limited edition Tour EP)
2010 - Redbird: Live at the Cafe Carpe (with Kris Delmhorst, Jeffrey Foucault, David Goodrich)
2011 - Nine Days Wonder (instrumental album with David Goodrich)
2012 - The Good Stuff 
2012 - Chaser (EP, companion to The Good Stuff)
2014 - Silver Ladder
2017 - Are You Listening?
2018 - There Is Another World
2020 - Live at the Cafe Carpe (with SistaStrings)
2022 - Love Is the Only Thing (& SistaStrings)

Singles 

2018 - The Fox
2018 - Fool's Errand
2022 - Who's Gonna Love You Now? 
2020 - Don't You Ever Change (with SistaStrings)
2020 - You Are The Only One (with SistaStrings)
2020 - What Else Was It? (with SistaStrings)
2021 - Take Down Your Flag (with SistaStrings)
2021 - Asshole in Space
2022 - You and (Everybody Else) (with SistaStrings)

Compilations 
1994 - "Acoustic Alliance: Vol. 1" 
1995 - "Acoustic Alliance Vol. 2"
 1998 - WXRV Presents: Live From River Music Hall, Vol. 1
 2000 - Main Stage Live (Falcon Ridge Folk Festival)
 2002 - WORDS: A Wisconsin Songwriter Compilation
 2002 - Wonderland: A Winter Solstice Celebration
 2004 - Signature Sounds 10th Anniversary Collection CD
 2004 - Paste Magazine Sampler #4

DVDs 
 2004 - On The Way
 2004 - Signature Sounds 10th Anniversary Collection DVD

References

External links
 Official Website
 Peter Mulvey collection at the Internet Archive's live music archive
 Peter Mulvey Interview on VOA

American male singer-songwriters
American folk singers
American singer-songwriters
Living people
1969 births
Signature Sounds artists